Nigel Whitmey (born 23 February 1963) is a British-Canadian actor who has appeared in TV series and films. He is also the husband of the actress Abigail Thaw, whom he met while training at RADA.

Early life
Whitmey was born in Peace River, Alberta, Canada. His family emigrated there from Liverpool, England, where his father had been employed as a medical officer of health. He came to London in the mid-1980s to study drama at RADA.

Career
His television credits include Black Earth Rising, Doctor Who, Attila, Casualty, Waking the Dead and Agatha Christie's Poirot. He is also known for voicing numerous games, including the two Battlefield games of the Bad Company series, Crysis Warhead and Cyberpunk 2077.

Personal life
At RADA, Whitmey met actress Abigail Thaw, whom he married in 1986. They have two children:  Molly Mae, born 1997, and Talia, born 2003. He has worked chiefly in Britain in film, television, and voice overs.

Filmography

References

External links
 

1963 births
Living people
Male actors from Alberta
British male film actors
British male television actors
British male video game actors
British male voice actors
Canadian male film actors
Canadian male television actors
Canadian male video game actors
Canadian male voice actors
Canadian emigrants to England
Alumni of RADA
Canadian people of English descent
Citizens of the United Kingdom through descent
20th-century British male actors
20th-century Canadian male actors
21st-century British male actors
21st-century Canadian male actors
Canadian expatriates in England